Montrell is a given name and surname. Notable people with the name include:

Given name
Montrell Craft (born 1987), American football player
Montrell Darrett, American gospel music singer
Montrell Teague (born 1991), American harness racing driver
Montrell Washington (born 1999), American football player

Surname
Roy Montrell (1928–1979), American rhythm & blues guitarist

See also
Montrel Meander (born 1994), American football player
Montrezl Harrell (born 1994), American basketball player
Montell, given name and surname